Alexander Reben (born 1985) is an American artist, researcher and roboticist. He is best known for his artworks created in collaboration with artificial intelligence, and his research in robotics. Reben's work has been exhibited widely in the United States and Western Europe, including the Museum of Applied Arts, Vienna and the Charlie James Gallery. His work is included in permanent collection of the MIT Museum. He currently serves as Director of Technology and Research at Stochastic Labs, a Berkley, California-based nonprofit incubator for artists, scientists and engineers.

Biography
Alexander Reben studied Robotics and Applied Math at the State University of New York, graduating with a BS in 2008. In 2008 he moved to MIT Media Lab, where he completed an MS in Media Arts and Sciences. He currently lives in California, USA.

Career
While at MIT Media Lab, Reben designed a social robot and autonomous filmmaker Boxie which specialized in interviewing people. and inspired the design of Baymax in Big Hero 6. The idea later led to the establishing of BlabDroid Inc., in 2013, a company specializing in developing social robots to interact with humans around the world and create documentaries based on collected interviews. His BlabDroids filmed interviews at International Documentary Film Festival Amsterdam (IDFA) and Tribeca Film Festival in 2013 and gained significant media attention.

Art
A core element of Reben's work lies in the conceptual study of technology’s symbiosis with humans, including collaborating with AI during the creation of artworks. His most distinguished artworks include: "amalGAN" which is based on an AI algorithm which reads a human body's signals to produce artistic outputs, that are completed by human painters as oil painted canvases, "AI Am I?" wherein an AI describes artworks that the artist renders in real life, "Robots in Residence" where social robots made autonomous documentaries, and "Deeply Artificial Trees" which combines the “Deep Dream” AI with painting, among others.

Solo exhibitions
2019 - Creative Work as Adversary: The AI Art of Alexander Reben, Emerson Media Art Gallery, Boston, MA
2019 - Contrasts in Action Still, stARTup Art Fair – Special Project, Los Angeles, CA
2018 - strange/r/evolution, SPRING/BREAK Art Show, New York, NY
2017 - wax chromatic, Charlie James Gallery, Los Angeles, CA
2015 - Engineering Psychology, Charlie James Gallery, Los Angeles, CA

Selected group exhibitions
2019 - Hello Robot, V&A Museum of Design, Dundee, Scotland
2018 - Seeing Eye Awareness, Galerija Vžigalica, Ljubljana, Slovenia
2018 - Hello Robot, Gewerbemuseum, Winterthur, Switzerland
2017 - Robots. Work. Our Future, Vienna Biennale, Vienna, Austria
2017 - Hello Robot, MAK Contemporary Art Museum, Vienna, Austria
2017 - Hierophant, Nicodim Gallery, Bucharest, Romania
2017 - The Basilisk, Nicodim Gallery, Los Angeles, CA
2017 - Hello Robot, Vitra Design Museum, Weil am Rhein, Germany
2013 - Robots in Residence, Storyscapes at the Tribeca Film Festival, New York, NY
2009 - Human Nature, ARS Electronica Festival, ARS Electronica, Linz, Austria

Collections
MIT Museum

References

External links
Official site

Living people
Massachusetts Institute of Technology alumni
American digital artists
Roboticists
Artificial intelligence researchers
21st-century engineers
1985 births